The 4th Parliament of Singapore was a meeting of the Parliament of Singapore. Its first session commenced on 7 February 1977 and was prorogued on 2 October 1978. It commenced its second session on 26 December 1978 and was dissolved on 5 December 1980.

The members of the 4th Parliament were elected in the 1976 general election. Parliament was controlled by a People's Action Party majority, led by Prime Minister Lee Kuan Yew and his Cabinet. The Speaker was Dr Yeoh Ghim Seng.

Officeholders 

 Speaker: Yeoh Ghim Seng (PAP)
 Deputy Speaker: Tang See Chim (PAP)
 Prime Minister: Lee Kuan Yew (PAP)
 Deputy Prime Minister:
 Goh Keng Swee (PAP)
 S. Rajaratnam (PAP), from 1 June 1980
 Leader of the House: Edmund W. Barker (PAP)
 Party Whip of the People's Action Party: Sia Kah Hui

Composition

Members 
This is the list of members of the 4th Parliament of Singapore elected in the 1977 general election.

By-elections

References 

Parliament of Singapore